George Osmond (May 23, 1836 – March 25, 1913) was a leader in the Church of Jesus Christ of Latter-day Saints (LDS Church), as well as a judge and state senator in Wyoming, and the ancestor of the musical Osmond family.

Osmond was born in London, England.  In 1850 he became a shipbuilder's apprentice in Woolwich. It was from fellow apprentices that he first heard of the LDS Church and was baptized on November 27, 1850. In 1854 he sailed in the Clara Wheeler to New Orleans and then went to St. Louis where he worked for James Eads. In 1855 while still in St. Louis Osmond married Georgina Huckvale.

In 1855 Osmond and his wife went to Utah Territory. They first settled in Bountiful and later moved to Willard. In 1864, they moved to the vicinity of Bear Lake in the town of Bloomington, Idaho.

Osmond served as bishop in Bloomington for seven years, and then as a counselor to William Budge in the presidency of the Bear Lake Stake. From 1884 to 1886 Osmond served as a Mormon missionary in England during which time he was assistant editor of the Millennial Star. From 1890 to 1892 he was again on a mission to the British Isles, during which he served first as president of the Scottish District and then as president of the London District.

Shortly after returning to the United States in 1892 Osmond was called as president of the newly organized Star Valley Stake.

At various times Osmond served as a probate judge and a justice of the peace. From 1899 to 1905 Osmond served two terms as a member of the Wyoming State Senate as a Republican from Uinta County, Wyoming.

Osmond practiced polygamy and was married to a second wife, Amelia Lovinia Christina Jacobsen, on September 8, 1881, when she was 19. George and Amelia Osmond's son Rulon Osmond was the father of George Osmond, who in turn was the father of The Osmonds of musical fame. His great-grandson Aaron Osmond eventually also became a politician. He died in Montpelier, Idaho.

References

Sources
Andrew Jenson. Latter-day Saints Biographical Encyclopedia. Vol. 1, p. 348.

1836 births
1913 deaths
19th-century Mormon missionaries
Converts to Mormonism
English emigrants to the United States
Mormon missionaries in England
Mormon missionaries in Scotland
Mormon pioneers
Osmond family (show business)
People from Montpelier, Idaho
People from Willard, Utah
People from Bountiful, Utah
People from Uinta County, Wyoming
People from London
Wyoming state court judges
Republican Party Wyoming state senators
English leaders of the Church of Jesus Christ of Latter-day Saints